Coleophora amiculella is a moth of the family Coleophoridae that can be found in Algeria and Tunisia.

Larvae possibly feed on Trifolium species.

References

External links

amiculella
Moths of Africa
Moths described in 1956